Edwin James  (born 1869) was a Welsh international footballer. He was part of the Wales national football team between 1893 and 1899, playing 8 matches and scoring 2 goals. He played his first match on 13 March 1893 against England and his last match on 4 March 1899 against Ireland.

See also
 List of Wales international footballers (alphabetical)

References

1869 births
Welsh footballers
Wales international footballers
Place of birth missing
Date of death missing
Association footballers not categorized by position